Bulla ampulla is a species of gastropods belonging to the family Bullidae.

The species has cosmopolitan distribution (except the Americas).

References

Bullidae
Taxa named by Carl Linnaeus
Gastropods described in 1758